Anna H. Jones (September 2, 1855 – March 7, 1932) was a Canadian-born American clubwoman, suffragist, and educator based in later life in Kansas City, Missouri.

Early life
Anna Holland Jones was born on September 2, 1855, in Chatham, Ontario, Canada, the daughter of Emily Francis Jones and James Monroe Jones. Her father was one of the first black graduates of Oberlin College, finishing in 1849. Her father was a gunsmith and engraver who, with his brother Elias Toussaint Jones, was involved with John Brown's Canadian abolition activities. Anna H. Jones attended university in Michigan, and graduated from Oberlin College in 1875.

Her sister Sophia Bethena Jones (1857–1932) became a medical doctor, and "the first black faculty member at Spelman College" and founder of the school's nursing program. Her sister Fredericka Florence Jones (1860-–) also became a teacher.

Career
Anna H. Jones taught elocution at Wilberforce University in Ohio from 1885 to 1892. She taught high school and was a school principal in Kansas City, Missouri, until 1916, when she retired from classroom work.

She was president of the Missouri Association of Colored Women's Clubs from 1903 to 1906. She raised the money to build a YMCA in Kansas City. She represented the Kansas City Colored Women's League in the talks that resulted in the creation of the National Association of Colored Women's Clubs. She wrote three biographical sketches for Hallie Q. Brown's Homespun Heroines and Other Women of Distinction (1926).

Jones traveled to London in 1900 for the First Pan-African Conference, in the company of Anna Julia Cooper, Fannie Barrier Williams, and Ella D. Barrier, among others. Jones and Cooper were the only two African-American women to address the Conference; Jones presented a paper titled "The Preservation of Race Individuality." She later corresponded with W. E. B. DuBois. In 1905 her two-part essay "A Century's Progress for the American Colored Woman" appeared in consecutive issues of Voice of the Negro magazine. Her short essay "Women Suffrage and Social Reform" appeared in a 1915 issue of The Crisis.

Katherine D. Tillman wrote a poem about Jones, titled "My Queen"..

Personal life
Jones moved to Monrovia, California, in 1921. She died there on March 7, 1932, aged 76. The Anna H. Jones Colored Women’s Club was organized in Monrovia in 1932, in her memory.

References

External links
A photograph of Anna H. Jones in later life, from the Oberlin University Archives.

1855 births
1932 deaths
Activists from Ohio
African-American suffragists
American suffragists
Canadian people of African-American descent
Oberlin College alumni